William Ian Rees Davies (24 May 1942 – 24 July 2014) was the Vice-Chancellor of the University of Hong Kong in 2000–2002. He died of kidney failure in 2014.

References

Vice-Chancellors of the University of Hong Kong
1942 births
2014 deaths